100 First Plaza (also known as the Delta Dental Tower) is a 27-story,  high-rise office building located at 100 First Street in the Financial District of San Francisco, California. Construction of the building was completed in 1988. It is the 35th-tallest building in the city. Skidmore, Owings & Merrill served as the design architects for the 100 First Plaza development that was designed with several setbacks, along with a grooved and faceted façade, and contains several rooftop curtain walls, and a notable  spire.

Tenants
ADR Services, Inc.
AppsFlyer
Andersen Tax
HomeLight
Okta

See also

 San Francisco's tallest buildings

References

External links
Official website

Financial District, San Francisco
Skyscraper office buildings in San Francisco
Skidmore, Owings & Merrill buildings
Office buildings completed in 1988
Leadership in Energy and Environmental Design gold certified buildings